The Government House, also known as Brick House or Governor's House, is located at Old GRA, Port Harcourt in Rivers State, Nigeria. It is the official residence of the Rivers State chief executive, the head of government, and the home to the governors of Rivers State and their families. It serves as the venue for the Governor's official business, as well as the many high-level government conferences, receptions, and functions hosted by the occupant.

Other events that take place at the Government House, include meetings such as that of the Executive Council, and the swearing-in of new cabinet members.

References

Buildings and structures in Port Harcourt (local government area)
Government of Rivers State
Landmarks in Port Harcourt
Official residences in Nigeria
Old GRA, Port Harcourt
Government Houses of the British Empire and Commonwealth